A contrail is a condensation trail caused by an aircraft.

Contrail or Contrails may also refer to:

Contrail (company), a defunct  video game developer
Contrail (software), a Cloud Federation computing project
 "Contrail" (song), a song by Namie Amur
Contrails (book), a handbook issued to new cadets entering the United States Air Force Academy
Contrail (horse) (born 2017), Japanese racehorse

See also
 Distrail
 Vapor Trail (disambiguation)